Charles Joseph Byrnes (1835 – 22 October 1917) was an Australian politician.

He was born in Parramatta, the youngest son of Ruth Barber and James Byrnes, a storekeeper and early New South Wales politician. His uncle William was also a member of the Legislative Council.

The younger Byrnes was articled to a solicitor, but chose business over law and took over the family wool mill at Parramatta. He also owned a tweed mill at Granville, and was a long-serving alderman and mayor of Parramatta. In 1874 he was elected to the New South Wales Legislative Assembly for Parramatta. He retired in 1877, was re-elected in 1880, and retired again in 1882. Byrnes died at Parramatta in 1917.

References

 

1835 births
1917 deaths
Members of the New South Wales Legislative Assembly
Mayors and Lord Mayors of Parramatta